Emmesa labiata is a species of false darkling beetle in the family Melandryidae. It is found in North America.

References

Further reading

 

Melandryidae
Articles created by Qbugbot